David Simpson (born 20 July 1983) is an Irish cricketer, from Derry, Northern Ireland. He is a left-handed batsman and a right-arm medium-fast bowler. He has represented Ireland A since 2006, as well as representing the Northern Cricket Union President's XI and the Irish Under-23 team.

External links
David Simpson at Cricket Archive 

1983 births
Irish cricketers
Living people
Sportspeople from Derry (city)
Cricketers from Northern Ireland